St. Xavier's Higher Secondary School is a private Catholic secondary school located in  Palayamkottai in the Tirunelveli district of Tamil Nadu, India. The school was established by the Jesuits in 1880 and provides co-educational schooling for students from standards VI through XII. The school includes a hostel for 300 boys and has an active alumni association, founded in 1990.

Chronology 
 1898: recognition of school by the Director of Public Instructions
 1899: boarding house established, that became a hostel with 10 boys in 1903
 1910: Secondary School Leaving Certificate (SSLC) scheme adopted
 1917: new high school building inaugurated
 1922: newly built hostel inaugurated, today's Sacred Heart Hostel
 1935: Scouting movement introduced
 1940s: introduction of school magazine, literary and debating societies, Hindi in curriculum, National Cadet Corps
 1950s: lunch for needy students; co-operative and credit union for teachers; engineering course; described as "glory years"; former teacher John P. Leonard SJ consecrated archbishop of Madurai; teacher Rajarethinam A. Sundaram consecrated bishop of Tanjore; graduate Peter Fernando would later become archbishop of Madurai; Our Lady of the Assumption church on campus consecrated in 1959
 1980s: Centenary Block built; students secured first and second ranks in SSLC exam (1982); cultural week initiated
 1990s: new outreach programs for underprivileged, rural, and refugee students (Loyola Study Centre, LASAC movement, STAAR charitable association run by students); modern biology lab; computer education from standard VI through XII
 2000: Arrupe administrative block built; Fr. Y.S Yagoo SJ introduced more extracurricular activities and state level tournaments in football and hockey, receiving the Dr. Radhakrishnan award in 2010.
 2011: entrance enhanced with gardens and wider roads

Activities 
A thorough tour of the campus is provided online. School activities include: Consumer Club, Eco Club, Arts & Crafts, Leveil Reading Club, Road Safety Patrol, Ignatian Band, Veeramamunivar Tamil Literary Association, Verdier Science Club, Arrupe Dispensary, and Arrupe Inter-Religious Centre. The boys have won state championships in hockey, volleyball, football, and in individual events in swimming, athletics, and Silambam (second place).

See also

 List of Jesuit schools
 List of schools in Tamil Nadu

References 

Christian schools in Tamil Nadu
High schools and secondary schools in Tamil Nadu
Education in Tirunelveli district
Jesuit secondary schools in India
Educational institutions established in 1880
1880 establishments in British India